Enter Sir John is a 1928 British crime novel by Clemence Dane and Helen Simpson. It concerns Martella Baring, a young actress, who is put on trial and convicted of murder and a fellow actor Sir John Saumarez who takes up her cause and tries to prove her innocence. It was followed by the sequel Re-enter Sir John in 1932.

Plot
Young actress Martella Baring is convicted of the murder of Edna Druce, the wife of the acting company's manager. The charming and clever Sir John Saumarez, himself an actor and the manager of an acting company, attends the trial and becomes convinced of Martella's innocence. He enlists the help of his stage manager and the stage manager's wife, and Sir John proceeds to prove Martella's innocence and save her from hanging for a crime she didn't commit

Film adaptations
In 1930, the book was adapted into two films: Murder! and a German-language version Mary, both of which were directed by Alfred Hitchcock. A number of changes were made from novel to screen, such as making Sir John a member of the jury while in the book he was just a spectator at the trial. Many authors have incorrectly claimed the book was also adapted as a play, but there is no evidence for this assertion.

References

Bibliography
 Chandler, Charlotte. It's only a movie: Alfred Hitchcock : a personal biography. First Applause, 2006.
 Barr, Charles. English Hitchcock. Cameron & Hollis, 1999.

1928 British novels
British crime novels
British novels adapted into films
Novels about actors
Novels by Clemence Dane